The Pyrenean rock lizard (Iberolacerta bonnali) is a species of lizard in the family Lacertidae. The species is endemic to the Pyrenees, where it occurs at high altitudes and is only active in summer.

Etymology and taxonomy
The specific name, bonnali, is in honor of the Count of Bonnal who collected amphibians and reptiles while living at Montgaillard, Hautes-Pyrénées. 
The Aran rock lizard was initially included here as a subspecies, Iberolacerta bonnali aranica, but is now considered a distinct species, Iberolacerta aranica.

Description
Its dorsal colour is greyish-brown, sometimes finely flecked with dark markings but without significant striping. The flanks are dark, sometimes with slight pale flecking. The underparts are white, greyish or greenish.

Geographic range and habitat
Its natural habitats are rocky crags and screes in limestone, slate and schist areas. It is frequently found on rocks close to alpine meadows and near torrents and glacial lakes. It is only active for a short period of the year in summer.

Reproduction
I. bonnali is oviparous.

Conservation status
The Pyrenean rock lizard is assessed by the International Union for Conservation of Nature as being  "near threatened". This is because, although the population seems to be stable and the lizard is present in a number of national parks and protected areas, it is vulnerable to disturbance to its habitat from skiing developments, the building of tracks, and the overgrazing of cattle. It may also be affected in the future by climate change.

References

Further reading
Arribas OJ, Carranza S (2012). "The Type Specimen of Iberolacerta bonnali is stored in the Natural History Museum, London". Butlettí de la Societat Catalana d'Herpetologia 20: 124-125.
Lantz AL (1927). "Quelques observations nouvelles sur l'herpétologie des Pyrénées centrales ". Revue d'Histoire Naturelle Appliquée, Paris 8: 54-61. (Lacerta monticola bonnali, new subspecies, p. 58). (in French).
Sindaco R, Jeremčenko VK (2008). The Reptiles of the Western Palearctic. 1. Annotated Checklist and Distributional Atlas of the Turtles, Crocodiles, Amphisbaenians and Lizards of Europe, North Africa, Middle East and Central Asia. (Monographs of the Societas Herpetologica Italica). Latina, Italy: Edizioni Belvedere. 580 pp. . (Iberolacerta bonnali).
Vences M, Rey J, Puente M, Miramontes C, Dominguez M (1998). "High altitude record of the Pyrenean lizard, Lacerta bonnali ". Zeitschrift für Feldherpetologie 5: 249–251.

Iberolacerta
Lizards of Europe
Reptiles described in 1927
Taxa named by Amédée Louis Lantz
Taxonomy articles created by Polbot